Antigona may refer to:

 Antigona (Mysliveček), a 1773 opera by Josef Mysliveček
 Antigona (Traetta), a 1772 opera by Tommaso Traetta
 , a 1939 play by Salvador Espriu
 , a 1960 play by Dominik Smole
 Antigona (bivalve), a genus of saltwater clams

See also
 Antigona Furiosa (play), by Griselda Gambaro
 Antigonae, a 1949 opera by Carl Orff
 Antigonai, an opera based on fragments by Sophocles and Hölderlin for three choirs and a women's trio by Carlos Stella
 Antigone (disambiguation)
 Antigonea (disambiguation)
 Antigonia (disambiguation)
 Sinfonía de Antígona, the Symphony No. 1 by Carlos Chávez